The 2016 Junior Africa Cup for Nations was an international field hockey competition held from 18 to 28 March 2016 in Windhoek, Namibia.

The tournament served as a direct qualifier for the 2016 Junior World Cup, with the winner and runner-up qualifying.

Qualified teams

Results

Pool Stage

Matches

Classification Stage

Semi-finals

Third and fourth place

Final

Statistics

Final standings

Goalscorers

References

See also
FIH 2016 Junior African Cup

Hockey Junior Africa Cup
Junior Africa cup for Nations
Africa cup for Nations
Junior Africa cup for Nations
Sport in Windhoek
International sports competitions hosted by Namibia
21st century in Windhoek
Junior Africa cup for Nations
Africa Cup